Marjolein Buis and Diede de Groot defeated the defending champion Aniek Van Koot and her partner Dana Mathewson in the final, 6–4, 6–3 to win the women's doubles wheelchair tennis title at the 2017 US Open.

Jiske Griffioen and van Koot were the reigning champions from when the event was last held in 2015, due to a scheduling conflict with the 2016 Summer Paralympics. However, Griffioen did not participate this year.

Seeds

Draw

Bracket

References
Draw

Wheelchair Women's Doubles
U.S. Open, 2017 Women's Doubles